Just a Woman is the thirty-seventh solo studio album by American country music singer-songwriter Loretta Lynn. It was released on July 8, 1985, by MCA Records.

Commercial performance 
The album peaked at No. 63 on the Billboard Top Country Albums chart. The album's first single, "Heart Don't Do This to Me", peaked at No. 19 on the Billboard Hot Country Songs chart. The second single, "Wouldn't It Be Great", peaked at No. 72. The third single, "Just a Woman", peaked at No. 82.

Track listing

Personnel 
Adapted from album liner notes.

Jimmy Bowen – producer
Larry Byrom – guitar
Mark Coddington – engineerChip Hardy – keyboards
John Hobbs – keyboards
David Hungate – bass guitar
David Innis – synthesizer
Jana King – backing vocals
Tim Kish – engineer
Simon Levy – art direction
Russ Martin – engineer
Weldon Myrick – steel guitar
Peter Brill Nash – photography
Mark O'Connor – fiddle, mandola
Donna Rhodes – backing vocals
Perry Rhodes – backing vocals
Gove Scrivenor – autoharp
Steve Tillisch – mixer
Ron Treat – recorded by
Billy Joe Walker Jr. - guitar
Ned Wimmer – backing vocals
Reggie Young – guitar

Chart positions 
Album – Billboard (North America)

Singles – Billboard (North America)

References 

1985 albums
Loretta Lynn albums
Albums produced by Jimmy Bowen
MCA Records albums